Pool A (Skopje) of the 2022 Billie Jean King Cup Europe/Africa Zone Group III was one of four pools in the Europe/Africa zone of the 2022 Billie Jean King Cup. Three teams competed in a round robin competition, with each team proceeding to their respective sections of the play-offs: the top team played for advancement to Group II in 2023.

Standings 

Standings are determined by: 1. number of wins; 2. number of matches; 3. in two-team ties, head-to-head records; 4. in three-team ties, (a) percentage of matches won (head-to-head records if two teams remain tied), then (b) percentage of sets won (head-to-head records if two teams remain tied), then (c) percentage of games won (head-to-head records if two teams remain tied), then (d) Billie Jean King Cup rankings.

Round-robin

Ireland vs. Seychelles

Iceland vs. Seychelles

Ireland vs. Iceland

References

External links 
 Billie Jean King Cup website

2022 Billie Jean King Cup Europe/Africa Zone